Pig Latin is a linguistic game that makes use of the English language. 

Pig Latin may also refer to:

Pig Latin, the programming language used by Apache Pig
"Pig Latin", a song by Baboon on the album Something Good Is Going to Happen to You